Boston Breach is an American professional Call of Duty League (CDL) esports team based in Boston, Massachusetts and is owned by Kraft Sports Group and Oxygen Esports.

History 
In December 2021, Kraft Sports Group and Oxygen Esports announced the establishment of a new Call of Duty League team based in Boston, Massachusetts. The following month the franchise revealed its branding and roster for the 2022 Call of Duty League season. During the season the team finished top 6, 3rd, top 12 and top 8 during the four majors, resulting in a 6th place finish in the overall standings. At the 2022 Call of Duty League Championship the team finished top 8 after a 3–2 loss to the Los Angeles Thieves and a 3–1 loss to the Toronto Ultra. Shortly after, the team announced that it would not be extending the contract of player Thomas "TJHaly" Haly.

Current roster

References

External links
 

Esports teams based in the United States
Call of Duty League teams
Esports teams established in 2021